Alessandro Cremona (born 1969) is an Italian actor best known in English language cinema for his role of the henchman Marco Sciarra in the James Bond film, Spectre (2015).

Biography
He was born in Busto Arsizio in the province of Varese. His family were originally from Piazza Armerina, in the province of Enna, in Sicily.

Selected filmography
Nirvana (1997), as a policeman
20 - Venti (2000)
Malèna (2000)
Miracle in Palermo! (2004), as the Boss
I giorni dell'abbandono (2005)
Taxi Lovers (2005)
The Bodyguard's Cure (2006), as Spada
Me and Marilyn (2009)
 (2010), as Mustafà
Reality (2012)
Spectre (2015), as Marco Sciarra a Ernst Stavro Blofeld henchman
Medici (2016), as Ferzetti
 (2019), as Fiore

References

External links

1969 births
20th-century Italian male actors
21st-century Italian male actors
Living people